GRAM domain containing 1C also known as Aster-C is a cholesterol transport protein that is encoded by the GRAMD1C gene.  It contains a transmembrane region, a GRAM domain and a VASt domain.  It is anchored to the endoplasmic reticulum through its transmembrane domain.

GRAMD1C has four paralogs: GRAMD1B and GRAMD1A and two without VASt domains, GRAMD2A and GRAMD2B.  Homologs of GramD proteins (Lam/Ltc proteins) are found in yeast.

The protein is expressed in the liver and testes.

Function 
When the plasma membrane contains high levels of cholesterol, GRAMD1c as well as GRAMD1a and GRAMD1b move to sites of contact between the plasma membrane and the endoplasmic reticulum.  GRAMD1 proteins then facilitate the transport of cholesterol into the endoplasmic reticulum.  Reduction of GRAMD1B and GRAMD1C suppresses the onset of a form of non-alcoholic fatty liver disease, non-alcoholic steatohepatitis (NASH) in mice.  The VASt domain is responsible for binding cholesterol while the GRAM domain determines the location of the protein through sensing of cholesterol and binding partially negatively charged lipids in the plasma membrane, especially phosphatidylserine.

References